The Puerto Rico Department of Sports and Recreation is the executive department of the government of Puerto Rico responsible of sports and recreation in the U.S. Commonwealth of Puerto Rico.

The department's headquarters complex is located in Santurce on the banks of the Martín Peña Channel in Santurce, Puerto Rico.

In January 2021, Ray Quiñones was designated by Governor Pedro Pierluisi as Secretary of the department.

History 
In October 2008 governor Aníbal Acevedo Vilá  inaugurated the new headquarters of the agency on the site of a former slum known as "El Fanguito" in San Juan at a cost of $24 million.

In June 2017 the FBI informed it had indicted seven individuals linked to a $9.8 million for money laundering and fraud while working for the agency from 2013 to 2016. Former secretary of the agency Ramón Orta was among those arrested. In January 2021 Orta was sentenced to six months in prison after pleading guilty.

Secretary

References

Executive departments of the government of Puerto Rico